Alexandru "Sandu" Boc (born 3 June 1946) is a retired Romanian footballer, who played as a defender.

Club career

Alexandru Boc was born on 3 June 1946 in Vașcău and played football as a defender, being known for using often the "Oxford procedure" for the public's delight which consisted of him letting the ball pass over or past him, and when the forward was about to gain possession of it, he would reach back and take it with the exterior side of the foot. Boc made his Divizia A debut on 11 October 1964, playing for Petrolul Ploiești in a 3–0 victory against CSMS Iași. In the following season he helped Petrolul win the 1965–66 Divizia A title, being used by coach Constantin Cernăianu in 26 matches in which he scored one goal, being the player with the highest grade point average in the entire championship according to the Sportul newspaper. He also played three games for The Yellow Wolves in the first round of the 1966–67 European Cup against Liverpool which include a 3–1 victory in which he scored a goal, however they did not manage to qualify to the next round. In 1967 he went to play for two seasons at Dinamo București, helping the club win the 1967–68 Cupa României in the first one. After one season in which he didn't play because he was in jail and another one spent in Divizia B at Sportul Studențesc București, Boc returned to play in Divizia A at Rapid București, helping the club win the 1971–72 Cupa României and took part in Rapid's 1971–72 UEFA Cup campaign, playing five games, as the team reached the eight-finals, eliminating Napoli and Legia Warsaw, being eliminated by the team who would eventually win the competition, Tottenham, also taking part in the 1972–73 European Cup Winners' Cup campaign, playing four games, helping the team reach the quarter-finals, eliminating Landskrona BoIS and Rapid Wien against whom he scored a goal, being eliminated by Leeds United who reached the final. He reunited with coach Cernăianu at Universitatea Craiova, winning the 1973–74 Divizia A title in which he played 32 games and scored one goal and at the last game of the season against Petrolul Ploiești which ended 0–0, Boc received a grade 10 in the Sportul newspaper as the team earned the point that mathematically made them champions. Alexandru Boc made his last Divizia A appearance on 10 December 1975 in a 3–0 away loss against FCM Reșița, having a total of 224 matches and 12 goals scored in the competition, also having a total of 22 games and two goals scored in European competitions.

International career
Alexandru Boc played five matches at international level for Romania, making his debut under coach Bazil Marian in a 1–1 against Uruguay, which took place on 4 January 1967 in Montevideo on Estadio Gran Parque Central. He played in two victories against Switzerland and a 2–2 against Greece at the successful 1970 World Cup qualifiers, however he missed the opportunity be part of the squad that went at the final tournament, being in jail at that time. After Romania's 1–0 victory from Lausanne against Switzerland at the 1970 World Cup qualifiers, journalist Eugen Barbu praised Boc in the Flacăra magazine:"If Nicolae Ceaușescu would give Boc the right to play in Europe and sell him, he could build a city with the money!".

Conviction
In 1969, during a evening spent at the Athenee Palace where he was staying with actor Cornel Patrichi among others at a table, a man threw a empty cigarette pack in Patrichi's glass, then a verbal confrontation between them started and Boc intervened and punched the man, afterwards the man was beaten by other people, ending with his leg broken. The man beaten up was a Securitate captain, so Boc confessed what happened and took all the responsibility of the situation on himself, relying on the fact that he was a football player at Dinamo București and wouldn't suffer any consequences but at the trial Patrichi sided with the Securitate captain. He was sentenced to a jail term of two years and a half, spending the first six months of the conviction in a relaxed environment having a telephone and a TV in his cell from the headquarters of the Militia Command in the center of Bucharest, where the minors were also imprisoned. After that period he was close to obtain a pardon from his conviction, but the Securitate found out about the light detention he had and at the pressure of Vasile Patilineț who found out that his wife had an affair with Boc and was a member of the Central Committee of the Romanian Communist Party who on 7 September 1970 had a meeting to discuss his case with dictator Nicolae Ceaușescu himself participating in it where it was decided that he would not be granted the pardon. He was sent to the Văcărești prison, afterwards being moved to one of the toughest prisons in Romania, the Policolor colony where he was in a insanitary cell with many criminals and he had to wake up each day at 4 a.m. to work and at every three hours a black Volga car with members of the Central Committee would come to verify if he works, looking at his hands to see if they have calluses. His teammates from Dinamo would sent him food and money, Cornel Dinu personally going to deliver the packages to him but because he was not allowed to go inside the prison, he would come through the back, entering through a cornfield to reach him at the prison's yard. After a total of 13 months spent in jail, Boc was released.

Personal life
Alexandru Boc was known for his success with women, being nicknamed "The ladies' man of Romanian football", having relationships among others with actresses Corina Chiriac and Aimée Iacobescu, volleyball player Elena Butnaru and was engaged with Salomeea Djanhanghir who was the granddaughter of the richest man on the planet at that time, the Shah of Iran, Mohammad Reza Pahlavi. The VIP magazine put Boc in the top 5 best Romanian men alongside Florin Piersic, Petre Roman, Ion Dichiseanu and Sergiu Nicolaescu. He was also an occasional film actor, playing alongside Romanian actors Toma Caragiu and Gheorghe Dinică in the 1975 comedy movie Nu filmăm să ne-amuzăm (We do not film to amuse ourselves) directed by Iulian Mihu.

Honours
Petrolul Ploiești
Divizia A: 1965–66
Dinamo București
Cupa României: 1967–68
Rapid București
Cupa României: 1971–72
Universitatea Craiova
Divizia A: 1973–74

Notes

References

External links

1946 births
Living people
People from Vașcău
Romanian footballers
Olympic footballers of Romania
Romania international footballers
Liga I players
Liga II players
FC Petrolul Ploiești players
FC Dinamo București players
FC Sportul Studențesc București players
FC Rapid București players
CS Universitatea Craiova players
Romanian criminals
Association football defenders